The Annual Review of Pathology: Mechanisms of Disease is a peer-reviewed academic journal that publishes an annual volume of review articles relevant to pathology. It was established in 2006 and is published by Annual Reviews. Its co-editors have been Jon C. Aster, Mel B. Feany, and Jayanta Debnath since 2021.  As of 2022, Journal Citation Reports gives the journal a 2021 impact factor of 32.350, ranking it first of 77 journal titles in the category "Pathology".

History
The Annual Review of Pathology: Mechanisms of Disease was first published in 2006 by the nonprofit publisher Annual Reviews. The editorial goals for the journal were to cover recent advancements in the study of disease mechanism and present new analytical methodologies for pathology. Its first co-editors were Abul K. Abbas, James R. Downing, and Vinay Kumar. Though it was initially in publication with a print volume, it is now only published electronically.

Scope and indexing
The Annual Review of Pathology: Mechanisms of Disease defines its scope as covering significant developments in research on the initiation and progression of human disease. As of 2022, Journal Citation Reports gives the journal a 2021 impact factor of 32.350, ranking it first of 77 journal titles in the category "Pathology".  It is abstracted and indexed in Scopus, Science Citation Index Expanded, EMBASE, MEDLINE, and Academic Search, among others.

Editorial processes
The Annual Review of Pathology: Mechanisms of Disease is helmed by the editor or the co-editors. The editor is assisted by the editorial committee, which includes associate editors, regular members, and occasionally guest editors. Guest members participate at the invitation of the editor, and serve terms of one year. All other members of the editorial committee are appointed by the Annual Reviews board of directors and serve five-year terms. The editorial committee determines which topics should be included in each volume and solicits reviews from qualified authors. Unsolicited manuscripts are not accepted. Peer review of accepted manuscripts is undertaken by the editorial committee.

Editors of volumes
Dates indicate publication years in which someone was credited as a lead editor or co-editor of a journal volume. The planning process for a volume begins well before the volume appears, so appointment to the position of lead editor generally occurred prior to the first year shown here. An editor who has retired or died may be credited as a lead editor of a volume that they helped to plan, even if it is published after their retirement or death.

 Abul K. Abbas, James R. Downing, and Vinay Kumar (2006)
 Abbas, Stephen J. Galli, and Peter M. Howley (2007–2015)
 Abbas, Galli, and Jon C. Aster (2016-2018)
 Abbas, Aster, and Mel B. Feany (2019–2020)
 Aster and Feany (2021)
 Aster, Feany, and Jayanta Debnath (present)

Current editorial board
As of 2022, the editorial committee consists of the three co-editors and the following members:

 Stephanie C. Eisenbarth
 Kojo S. J. Elenitoba-Johnson
 Lora Hedrick Ellenson
 Karen M. Frank
 Stephen J. Galli
 Peter M. Howley
 Satdarshan P. Monga
 Asma Nusrat
 Warren S. Pear
 Frederick Klauschen

See also
 Annual Review of Genomics and Human Genetics
 Annual Review of Medicine
 Annual Review of Neuroscience

References 

 

Pathology: Mechanisms of Disease
Annual journals
Publications established in 2006
English-language journals
Pathology journals